The Winnebago LeSharo (also marketed as Itasca Phasar, with different color schemes and some equipment changes) is a Class B (low-profile) recreational vehicle that was assembled by Winnebago Industries in Forest City, Iowa.  While using a cutaway van chassis like larger motorhomes, the lower-roofed LeSharo was designed in the interest of fuel efficiency, derived from the front-wheel drive Renault Trafic Mk1.  Imported into the United States directly by Winnebago Ind as a FWD, LWB Platform truck without rear lighting and with a 20 cm wider rear axle as used in the larger Renault Master Mk1 commercial truck (B80 chassis). The Trafic Mk1 platform chassis included a 2.1L TB diesel already approved for sale in the USA by CARB in several AMC-Jeep models from 1984-1987, although the Winnebago versions came as either normally aspirated (1983-1984) or with a larger Garrett T04 turbo-charger (1984-1986) than the Jeeps' Garrett T03. Later models included custom offering from Renault of the same 2.2L gasoline engine that was already EPA and CARB approved in the North American versions of the '84-86 Renault Fuego and R18i (sportwagon) through to the Winnebago LeSharo/Itasca Phasar, mid-89 MY. In 1989, Renault offered the Trafic Mk1 for the first time with a 2.2L engine in the European marketplace; however, the engine featured a BENDIX EFI identical to that approved for the Eagle Medallion (rebadged Renault R21 model, mfr'd in France.)  NOTE: At the time, Renault was the principal shareholder of American Motors Corp that included AMC, Jeep and Eagle brands. The use of already approved engines for emissions concerns... allowed Winnebago smooth sailing in getting the small campervan approved for sale in all 50 States. The Achilles Heel in the model was the automatic transmission... originally fitted to the Renault Trafic Mk1, FWD, SWB, MPV with a 1.4L, C-series engine...as fitted to the Renault LeCar (R5), Alliance (R9) and Encore (R11) for sale in North America. The transmission was never designed nor intended to support a 100 HP engine pulling a 3 ton campervan.   

LeSharo/Phasar sales ended after the 1992 model year.  Problems with Winnebago's Dealership service  warranties caused some concerns with owners who got the Consumer Product Safety Commission involved in addressing poor to shoddy repairs through Winnebago's Dealer Network and dealers not honoring their implied warranties. The maintenance teams were never trained by AMC-Renault to maintain the vehicles: Winnebago Ind cut & paste sections of available Trafic Mk1 and Renault R25 service manuals, et al...  provided the AMC-Renault, 12 inch, Pioneer Laser Disks in English and the factory tools and test equipment provided by Renault, France as included under the purchase contracts to address service and maintenance without proper factory training of their mechanics either by AMC-Renault (USA/Canada) or Renault-France.  In late 1993, Winnebago Ind of Forest City, IA sold limited rights for the Lesharo/Phasar (called the H-Body) campervan to a 3rd Party retailer called, MobilityRV. MobilityRV obtained ALL existing parts inventories from all Winnebago Authorized Dealers and sells/sold them online as WinnebagoParts. This effectively absolved Winnebago Ind of any further liability for service warranties through its Dealer Network as the units were discontinued for either service, sales or parts by their authorized dealerships.   

From 1995 to 2003, Winnebago revisited the concept with the Rialta.  While configured similar to the LeSharo, the Rialta was based upon the Volkswagen Eurovan chassis, offering far more power output with the L5 engine; first featured in the 1983 VW Quantum in North America, sold as the Passat Santana elsewhere. The second version used the narrow angle VR6 engine that offered power output improvements over the earlier L5 ( 5 cylinders, in-line).  The last Rialta edition was a substantial upgrade to the 24V, V6 engine.  Owners complaints about high maintenance costs resulted from lack of room to work underneath the hood/bonnet with the entire engine bay stuffed with the engine and accessories.  The rear axle was welded by Winnebago in-house to make it wider and over time, the rear axle warped/bent from the 3 tons of weight.

First generation (1983-1986) 
  The unit pictured is a one-off custom production. 
Built during the era when tougher fuel economy laws had just come into effect in the US and the national speed limit was 55 mph to save fuel, the LeSharo was intended to appeal to drivers who wanted better fuel efficiency than traditional motor homes. The chassis and cab were built by Renault, based on the same platform as the Renault Trafic Mk1 (T5, FWD, LWB). Renault sold platform trucks to Winnebago All the 1983 models were powered by the 2068cc all aluminum OHC 4 cylinder normally-aspirated diesel engine (producing 66 hp) with a four-speed manual transaxle, yielding 22 mpg (US). In 1984 an optional Garrett T04 turbo charger was added, increasing power to 75 hp. In 1985, a 2165 cc Bosch fuel injected, four-cylinder gasoline engine became available, with a three-speed computer-controlled automatic transaxle. At , this version delivered more power but somewhat less fuel economy and making the vehicle 423 lb (192 kg) heavier. A heavy duty rear axle was included in 1986 and subsequent MYs. After 1986, the diesel engine was discontinued. Catalytic converters and carbon canisters were not required for motor vehicles exclusively for sale in Europe and were only fitted for the US market to comply with the US E.P.A. requirements for exhaust and evaporative emissions at the time. The Lesharo was fitted with a catalytic converter made by Teneco Walker's European division and a carbon canister from GM to comply with conformance standards.

Winnebago also produced the Centauri, with seating for seven, closer in layout to a conversion van (minus the bathroom, full bed and kitchenette); it was produced through 1985. The two-seat Utility Van was produced from 1984 to 1992, later years retained the early style rear section to accommodate the optional door(s).

Second generation (1987-1992)

The Winnebago LeSharo was redesigned for the 1987 model year with a more aerodynamic design and a larger rear window. The spare tire was moved from the outside rear into a rear storage compartment. The diesel engine was no longer available. An optional five-speed manual transaxle became available in 1988 and 1989 only. In mid-1989, the fuel injection unit was changed from a Bosch LU-Jetronic with Lambda Probe (oxygen sensor) to a RENIX (Renault-Bendix joint venture) based one. Therefore, fuel injection parts between the differing units are not interchangeable as Bosch connectors are rectangular and RENIX ones are oval.

Total U.S. sales
Approximately 21,000 Renault Trafic I based, Winnebago vehicles were sold between 1983 and 1992 which included the Lesharo, Itasca Phasar, Centuri, Utility Van (two-seater),and a limited number of base shells which were sold to a Wisconsin RV builder and marketed under the "Sunset" brand name.

References

External links
 Winnebago Industries

Recreational vehicles
Front-wheel-drive vehicles
1980s cars
1990s cars
Vehicles introduced in 1983
Motor vehicles manufactured in the United States